This is a list of Members elected to the Legislative Council in the colonial period at the 1991 election, held on 15 September 1991.

Composition
{| class="wikitable sortable"
|-
!class="unsortable"|
!class="unsortable"|
!Affiliation
!Election
!At dissolution
|-
| bgcolor=Pink rowspan=8 |
| bgcolor="" |
| Co-operative Resources Centre/Liberal Party
| align="right" |0
| align="right" |15
|-
| bgcolor="" |
| Liberal Democratic Federation of Hong Kong
| align="right" |3
| align="right" |1
|-
| bgcolor="" |
| Hong Kong Federation of Trade Unions/Democratic Alliance for the Betterment of Hong Kong
| align="right" |1
| align="right" |1
|-
| bgcolor="" |
| New Hong Kong Alliance
| align="right" |1
| align="right" |1
|-
| bgcolor="" |
| Federation for the Stability of Hong Kong
| align="right" |3
| align="right" |0
|-
| bgcolor="" |
| Business and Professionals Federation of Hong Kong
| align="right" |2
| align="right" |0
|-
| bgcolor="" |
| Breakfast Group
| align="right" |0
| align="right" |6
|-
| bgcolor="" |
| Independent
| align="right" |13
| align="right" |2
|-bgcolor=Pink
|style="background-color:Pink" colspan=3 | Total for Conservatives/pro-Beijing
|align="right" |23
|align="right" |26
|-
| bgcolor=LightGreen rowspan=7 |
| bgcolor="" |
| United Democrats of Hong Kong/Democratic Party
| align="right" |14
| align="right" |15
|-
| bgcolor="" |
| Hong Kong Democratic Foundation
| align="right" |2
| align="right" |1
|-
| bgcolor="" |
| Hong Kong Association for Democracy and People's Livelihood
| align="right" |1
| align="right" |1
|-
| bgcolor="" |
| Hong Kong and Kowloon Trades Union Council
| align="right" |1
| align="right" |1
|-
| bgcolor="" |
| Hong Kong Confederation of Trade Unions
| align="right" |0
| align="right" |1
|-
| bgcolor="" |
| Meeting Point
| align="right" |2
| align="right" |0
|-
| 
| align="right" |3
| align="right" |4
|-style="background-color:LightGreen"
|colspan=3 | Total for Liberals/pro-democracy
|align="right" |23
|align="right" |23
|-
|style="background-color:#E9E9E9" |
| bgcolor="" |
|style="background-color:#E9E9E9" | Non-aligned Independent
|style="background-color:#E9E9E9" align="right" |10
|style="background-color:#E9E9E9" align="right" |8
|-
|style="background-color:#E9E9E9" |
|style="background-color:#E9E9E9" |
|style="background-color:#E9E9E9" | Ex officio members|style="background-color:#E9E9E9" align="right" |3|style="background-color:#E9E9E9" align="right" |3|-
|style="background-color:#E9E9E9" |
|style="background-color:#E9E9E9" |
|style="background-color:#E9E9E9" | President (Governor)
|style="background-color:#E9E9E9" align="right" |1
|style="background-color:#E9E9E9" align="right" |0
|-
|style="background-color:#E9E9E9" |
|style="background-color:#E9E9E9" |
|style="background-color:#E9E9E9" | Total
|align="right" style="background-color:#E9E9E9" |60
|align="right" style="background-color:#E9E9E9" |60
|-
|}

Note: Italic represents organizations that still function but become under another affiliation.

Graphical representation of the Legislative Council

List of Members elected in the legislative election
The following table is a list of LegCo members elected on 15 September 1991. Members who did not serve throughout the term are italicised''.

Key to changes since legislative election:
a = change in party allegiance
b = resigned/by-election
c = other change
d = did not take seat

By-elections
 A by-election was held for the New Territories West after the elected member Tai Chin-wah refused to take the seat and was subsequently discovered forging credentials. Zachary Wong Wai-yin of the Meeting Point won the vacant seat on 8 December 1991.
 30 August 1992, another by-election was held for the vacant seat in New Territories West after Ng Ming-yum died in office, Independent rural leader Tang Siu-tong was elected.
 15 July 1993, James Tien, former appointed unofficial member of the Legislative Council won in the Industrial (First) by-election after the incumbent Stephen Cheong died of a heart attack.
 28 July 1993, Alfred Tso won in the by-election for the Regional Council after legislator Gilbert Leung found guilty in for trying to bribe two regional councillors to vote for him in the 1991 election and was removed from the seat.
 5 March 1993, Lee Cheuk-yan replaced Lau Chin-shek in the Kowloon Central constituency after Lau resigned from his office in protest after an important labour bill which he had amended to protect workers was withdrawn by the government.

Other changes
 Allen Lee, the Senior Unofficial Member of the Council with some other 17 appointed members founded a political grouping called Co-operative Resources Centre on 12 December 1991 as a counter-force to the United Democrats of Hong Kong. The group eventually transformed into the Liberal Party on 6 June 1993.
 Tam Yiu-chung (Labour) unionist from the Hong Kong Federation of Trade Unions co-founded the Beijing-loyalist party the Democratic Alliance for the Betterment of Hong Kong in July 1992. Tam became the sole representative in the Council until 1995.
 Rita Fan, Edward Chen and Felice Lieh Mak, three appointed members resigned and subsequently replaced by Christine Loh, Roger Luk and Anna Wu.
 Edward Leong Che-hung (Medical), member of the Hong Kong Democratic Foundation joined the Meeting Point.
 The two largest pro-democratic parties the United Democrats of Hong Kong and Meeting Point merged into a new party called the Democratic Party on 2 October 1994, all LegCo members from the previous two parties except for Edward Leong joined the newly formed party.

See also
 1991 Hong Kong legislative election

Citations

References
 Database on LegCo Members

Legislative Council of Hong Kong